John Mangan (8 February 1853, Listowel  – 1 July 1917, Killarney) was an Irish Roman Catholic bishop.

McRedmond was educated at St Patrick's College, Maynooth and ordained in 1877. He received the degree of Doctor of Divinity (DD). He served for a few years in the Liverpool Mission; after which he was a teacher at St Michael’s College, Listowel. He was the parish priest of Glengariff, then Archdeacon of Aghadoe, and Vicar-General of Kerry. He was Bishop of Ardfert and Aghadoe from 1904 until his death.

References

1853 births
1904 deaths
20th-century Roman Catholic bishops in Ireland
Roman Catholic Bishops of Ardfert and Agahdoe
Alumni of St Patrick's College, Maynooth
People from Birr, County Offaly